{{DISPLAYTITLE:C15H17ClN2O2}}
The molecular formula C15H17ClN2O2 (molar mass: 292.76 g/mol) may refer to:

 Climbazole
 Lortalamine (LM-1404)

Molecular formulas